Dan K. Williams (born February 1, 1956) is an American politician and pastor. A Democrat, he has represented the 74th district in the Pennsylvania House of Representatives since 2018.

Pennsylvania House of Representatives

Elections

2018 election 

On January 30, 2018, Williams launched his campaign for the 74th District. The district had previously been represented by three-term Republican Harry Lewis, who had announced he was not running for reelection. Williams faced a three-way primary against Downingtown mayor and 2014 and 2016 nominee Josh Maxwell, and Villanova University professor Frank Pryor. Williams was endorsed by State Senator Andy Dinniman and numerous labor leaders.

On May 15, Williams won the primary with 43.5% share of the votes cast, and went on to face Republican Amber Little-Turner. Williams defeated Little-Turner in the general election with 61.36% of the vote.

2020 election 

Williams ran for re-election in 2020. He defeated Republican Dale Hensel with 64.38% of the vote.

2022 election 

Williams ran for re-election in 2022 in a re-match with his 2020 opponent, Republican Dale Hensel. Redistricting was expected to make the district much more competitive, but Williams still prevailed with 55.90% of the vote.

Results

Tenure 

During his first term, Williams wrote a bill focused on updating police training in several areas, including recognizing and reporting child abuse; de-escalation and harm reduction techniques; interacting with individuals of diverse racial, ethnic, and economic backgrounds; and appropriate use of force. On May 8, 2020, following the George Floyd protests, the Pennsylvania Legislative Black Caucus took over the House chamber to demand action on police reforms, including Williams's House Bill 1910. The bill passed through both chambers unanimously and was signed into law as Act 59 by Governor Tom Wolf on July 14. These changes were the largest updates to PA policing in 40 years.

Committee assignments, 2021-2022 
Source: PA House Democratic Caucus
Aging & Older Adult Services
Human Services
Professional Licensure
Veterans Affairs & Emergency Preparedness, Democratic Secretary

Political positions

War on Drugs 
Williams has described the War on Drugs as changing to the "Opioid Epidemic when the demographic changed" and stated that addicts need treatment and not incarceration. He believes those in our criminal justice system need more treatment options within the system. He believes insurance companies must be held responsible to cover addictions and other behavioral health issues.

Education 
Williams supports giving teachers a living wage. He believes students should have the best learning environment available to them, along with reasonable class sizes. He supports creating a setting that fosters equitable education, brings up standardized test scores, and creates a safer learning environment for Coatesville Area School District students.

Equality 
Williams supports state sanctioned marriage between two people, regardless of gender. He also supports equality when it comes to employment and access to healthcare.

Gun control 
Williams supports eliminating straw purchase and gun show loopholes, increasing the purchase age in order to buy a gun to 21, improving Pennsylvania's background check system, and protections in cases of domestic violence and PFAs. He also believes in the rights provided for in the Second Amendment of the United States Constitution.

Infrastructure 
Williams supports extending the entry ramp to the Route 30 bypass East from Route 82 North by 1,000 feet or more.

Taxation 
Williams supports a severance tax on natural gas extractors, but not increasing property taxes.

Reproductive rights 
Williams is pro-choice and supports state funding for Planned Parenthood and other organizations that provide women's reproductive healthcare, family planning and other health and community services.

References

External links

Living people
People from Chester County, Pennsylvania
Democratic Party members of the Pennsylvania House of Representatives
African-American state legislators in Pennsylvania
1956 births
21st-century African-American politicians
20th-century African-American people
Geneva College alumni
African-American religious leaders
Politicians from Chester County, Pennsylvania